Double Trigger (24 March 1991 – 23 February 2020) was a Thoroughbred racehorse and active sire. He was bred in Ireland, but trained in the United Kingdom throughout his racing career, which lasted from 1993 to 1998. A specialist stayer, he is best known for winning twelve group races, including the Stayers' Triple Crown in 1995.

Background
Double Trigger was bred in Ireland, a son of the King George VI and Queen Elizabeth Stakes winner Ela-Mana-Mou. His dam was the French-bred mare Solac, who also produced Double Trigger's full brother, the top-class stayer Double Eclipse. He was trained throughout his career by Mark Johnston in North Yorkshire. His most regular jockey was Jason Weaver, who rode him in 21 of his 29 starts. He was an easily recognisable horse, being a light chestnut with a broad white blaze and a front-running racing style.

Racing career

1993–1994:early career
Double Trigger showed himself to be a promising horse from the start, following a ten-length win in a Redcar maiden in September 1993 with a victory in the Listed Zetland Stakes at Newmarket a month later.

His three-year-old career was delayed by injury problems, but when he did re-appear, he was immediately tested at the highest level. A fifth place in the Great Voltigeur Stakes at York was followed by a third in the St. Leger Stakes. He then embarked on a brief international campaign, "easily" winning the St Leger Italiano (then a Group 3 race) and finishing seventh of fourteen to Red Bishop in the inaugural Hong Kong Vase.

1995:four-year-old season

Although Double Trigger was obviously Group class over middle-distances, his connections realised that he had the stamina for longer distances, and he was campaigned accordingly from then on.

In 1995 he was a Champion Stayer, winning the Sagaro and Henry II Stakes in spring before taking the Stayers' Triple Crown of the Ascot, Goodwood and Doncaster Cups. Although his best performance was probably at Ascot, where he beat the St Leger winner Moonax by five lengths, his Goodwood triumph was even more notable, as he prevailed by a neck over his full brother Double Eclipse in a "thrilling" finish. Johnston called it "a hell of a performance."

At the end of the season he was sent to Australia, where he went off 7-2 favourite for the Melbourne Cup under top weight of 9 stone 7 pounds. He ran very poorly and finished seventeenth of the twenty runners. Tests carried out after the race revealed no signs of "doping" and Johnston admitted that the performance was "a mystery".

1996–1998:later career

Double Trigger was never quite so dominant again, but he continued to produce in top-class performances for the next three years. In 1996 he recorded his second win in the Henry II Stakes after being pushed along all the way and catching Grey Shot close to the finish. He added a repeat victory in the Sagaro Stakes, but was beaten by Classic Cliche in the Ascot Gold Cup. He had been affected by a hoof injury before the Ascot race, and the problem recurred, ruling him out of the Goodwood meeting. He returned in September to beat Celeric in the Doncaster Cup showing, according to Greg Wood writing in the Independent, "all his famous swagger and resolution" .

His 1997 campaign was his least successful and he began with two of his worst performances, finishing unplaced in both the Sagaro Stakes and the Gold Cup (won by Celeric), leading some to conclude that he was no longer a threat in major races. He did, however, produce one excellent performance to win his second Goodwood Cup, setting a "fierce pace" from the start and beating Classic Cliche by one and a half lengths.

In his final year (1998) he proved almost as good as ever, narrowly failing to defeat Kayf Tara in the Ascot Gold Cup, before adding a third win in the Goodwood Cup. In his final start he led from the start in what Johnston described as "classical Double Trigger" style, and stayed on to hold off the late challenge of Busy Flight and win a third Doncaster Cup. The horse received an enthusiastic reception from his home crowd and his trainer praised him, saying "Over two miles at his best, Double Trigger is one of the best there has been".

A plan to run in the Prix du Cadran was abandoned and was then retired to stud.

Major wins

Assessment
Double Trigger won the Cartier Racing Award for Top European Stayer in 1995. He was given a rating of 123 by Timeform.

He has been honoured with a bronze statue at Doncaster Racecourse.

Assessing Double Trigger in the Racing Post Tony Morris wrote

Stud career
Like many stayers, Double Trigger struggled to attract top quality mares at stud. He had some success with jumpers, his most notable winner being Russian Trigger, winner of the Midlands Grand National. He died at the age of 29 of a suspected heart attack at Clarendon Farm Stud in Wiltshire in February 2020. Mark Johnston said "It seems that, no matter what champions I trained or might be lucky enough to train in future, I will always be remembered more for having trained Double Trigger than for anything else. He captured the public's imagination like no other animal that I have been associated with, and rightly so".

Pedigree

Namesake
In September 1999, train operator Great North Eastern Railway named locomotive 91022 at Doncaster railway station after the horse.

References

1991 racehorse births
2020 racehorse deaths
Cartier Award winners
Racehorses trained in the United Kingdom
Racehorses bred in Ireland
Thoroughbred family 19-b